Emil Najman (21 January 1907 - 22 August 1989) was a Yugoslav pediatrician who in 1952 (with ) described the Imerslund-Gräsbeck syndrome.

References

1907 births
1987 deaths
Yugoslav pediatricians